Finlayson Channel is a channel of the British Columbia Coast, Canada. It is a northern extension of Milbanke Sound. To its west are Swindle and Sarah Islands, to its east Roderick, Susan and Dowager Islands. It was first charted in 1793 by James Johnstone, one of George Vancouver's lieutenants during his 1791-95 expedition.

References

Channels of British Columbia
North Coast of British Columbia